The Sea Stars, also known as Team Sea Stars, are a professional wrestling tag team consisting of sisters Ashley Vox and Delmi Exo (real names Ashley and Elizabeth Medrano). The two are the longest Shimmer Tag Team Champions in history. They are also currently signed to Major League Wrestling (MLW).

History 

They first fought together in 2015. They have appeared in All Elite Wrestling (AEW), Impact Wrestling, Ring of Honor (ROH) and notably for Shimmer Women Athletes, where they became Shimmer Tag Team Champions in 2019.

Independent Circuit (2015–present) 
The two wrestled at Shimmer Women's Wrestling in 2019 where they won and became the Shimmer Tag Team Champions by defeating Cheerleader Melissa and Mercedes Martinez on November 2, 2019 at Volume 115. The two are also the longest reigning Shimmer Tag Team Champions in history passing the days of 993 during their first reign.

Impact Wrestling (2020) 
The team joined Impact Wrestling in 2020 to compete for the revived Knockouts Tag Team Championship in the 2020 revival tournament but we're not successful as they lost to Fire 'N Flava in the first round. On December 12, at Final Resolution, they fought Havok and Nevaeh in a losing effort.

Major League Wrestling (MLW) (2021–present) 
The team wrestles on the MLW roster.

Championships
 Battle Club Pro
 BCP Tag Team Championship (1 time)
 Sabotage Wrestling
 Sabotage Tag Team Championship (1 time)
 Shimmer Women Athletes
 Shimmer Tag Team Championship (1 time, current)

References

All Elite Wrestling teams and stables
Impact Wrestling teams and stables
Major League Wrestling teams and stables
Independent promotions teams and stables
Women's wrestling teams and stables